Pseudoniphargus is a genus of crustacean in family Pseudoniphargidae. It contains the following species:

Pseudoniphargus adriaticus Karaman, 1955
Pseudoniphargus affinis Notenboom, 1987
Pseudoniphargus africanus Chevreux, 1901
Pseudoniphargus associatus Sànchez, 1991
Pseudoniphargus branchiatus Stock, 1980
Pseudoniphargus brevipedunculatus Stock, 1980
Pseudoniphargus burgensis Notenboom, 1986
Pseudoniphargus calliaicus Notenboom, 1987
Pseudoniphargus candelariae Sànchez, 1990
Pseudoniphargus cazorlae Notenboom, 1987
Pseudoniphargus cupicola Stock, 1988
Pseudoniphargus daviui Jaume, 1991
Pseudoniphargus duplus Messouli, Messana & Yacoubi-Khebiza, 2006
Pseudoniphargus eborarius Notenboom, 1986
Pseudoniphargus elongatus Stock, 1980
Pseudoniphargus fragilis Notenboom, 1987
Pseudoniphargus frontinalis Stock, 1988
Pseudoniphargus gibraltaricus Notenboom, 1987
Pseudoniphargus gomerae Stock, 1988
Pseudoniphargus gorbeanus Notenboom, 1986
Pseudoniphargus gracilis Notenboom, 1987
Pseudoniphargus granadensis Notenboom, 1987
Pseudoniphargus grandimanus Stock, Holsinger, Sket & Iliffe, 1986
Pseudoniphargus grandis Notenboom, 1987
Pseudoniphargus guernicae Notenboom, 1986
Pseudoniphargus illustris Notenboom, 1987
Pseudoniphargus incantatus Notenboom, 1986
Pseudoniphargus inconditus Karaman & Ruffo, 1989
Pseudoniphargus jereanus Notenboom, 1986
Pseudoniphargus latipes Notenboom, 1987
Pseudoniphargus leucatensis Brehier & Jaume, 2009
Pseudoniphargus littoralis Stock & Abreu, 1993
Pseudoniphargus longicarpus Notenboom, 1986
Pseudoniphargus longicauda Stock, 1988
Pseudoniphargus longiflagellum Fakhar-el-Abiari, Oulbaz, Messouli & Coineau, 1999
Pseudoniphargus longipes Coineau & Boutin, 1996
Pseudoniphargus longispinum Stock, 1980
Pseudoniphargus macrotelsonis Stock, 1980
Pseudoniphargus macrurus Stock & Abreu, 1993
Pseudoniphargus margalefi Notenboom, 1987
Pseudoniphargus maroccanus Boutin & Coineau, 1987
Pseudoniphargus mateusorum Stock, 1980
Pseudoniphargus mercadoli Pretus, 1988
Pseudoniphargus montanus Notenboom, 1986
Pseudoniphargus multidens Stock, 1988
Pseudoniphargus nevadensis Notenboom, 1987
Pseudoniphargus obritus Messouli, Messana & Yacoubi-Khebiza, 2006
Pseudoniphargus pedrerae Pretus, 1990
Pseudoniphargus pityusensis Pretus, 1990
Pseudoniphargus planasiae Messouli, Messana & Yacoubi-Khebiza, 2006
Pseudoniphargus porticola Stock, 1988
Pseudoniphargus portosancti Stock & Abreu, 1993
Pseudoniphargus racovitzai Pretus, 1990
Pseudoniphargus romanorum Coineau & Boutin, 1996
Pseudoniphargus ruffoi Coineau & Boutin, 1996
Pseudoniphargus salinus Stock, 1988
Pseudoniphargus semielongatus Notenboom, 1986
Pseudoniphargus sodalis Karaman & Ruffo, 1989
Pseudoniphargus sorbasiensis Notenboom, 1987
Pseudoniphargus spiniferus Notenboom, 1986
Pseudoniphargus stocki Notenboom, 1987
Pseudoniphargus triasi Jaume, 1991
Pseudoniphargus unisexualis Stock, 1980
Pseudoniphargus unispinosus Stock, 1988
Pseudoniphargus vasconiensis Notenboom, 1986
Pseudoniphargus vomeratus Notenboom, 1987

References

Gammaridea
Taxonomy articles created by Polbot